Orde may refer to:

People

Given name
 Orde Ballantyne (born 1962), a Vincentian athlete at the 1988 Olympics 
 Orde M. Coombs (1939–1984), African-American writer and editor 
 Orde Kittrie, American professor of law
 Orde Wingate (1903–1944), unconventional British Army officer

Surname
 Orde (surname)

Other
 Orda (organization), sociopolitical structure on the steppes